Park County is the name of three counties in the United States:

Park County, Colorado 
Park County, Jefferson Territory
Park County, Montana 
Park County, Wyoming